Vinehall School is a co-educational day, boarding school and nursery located near the town of Robertsbridge, East Sussex. It takes children from ages 2 to 13. The school received an Independent Schools Inspectorate.

The school received a full inspection by the Independent Schools Inspectorate in February 2018. Vinehall School was inspected by Ofsted in 2011.

History

In the 1830s Vinehall was owned and remodelled by Tilden Smith Esq, a partner of the Hastings Old Bank. Tilden Smith ended up bankrupt in 1857 and the estate was sold to Felix Champney for £20,170. In October 1857 Felix sold the Estate to William Rushton Adamson for £35,700, the house was renamed Rushton Park. 

In 1902 the estate was sold to Thomas Gair Ashton, who later became the Baron Ashton of Hyde. When Lady Ashton died in 1938, the estate was sold to John Jacoby. Vinehall started its life as a country preparatory school for boys aged five to fourteen years, opening with six local children. The first headmaster was John Jacoby.

During the Second World War, the school was evacuated to Killerton Park in Devon along with Battle Abbey School a local girls’ school that John Jacoby's Mother Mary Jacoby, was Headmistress at. The buildings where home to Canadian troops during the war. The school returned to Robertsbridge in September 1945 after the war. In 1946 the estate was bought by Major Tom Stuart-Menteath and his wife Kitty. He ran the school until 1957, at which point it was handed down to his stepson Richard Taylor and his wife Patricia. Several new buildings were added, including a new classroom block, science labs, a theatre, and an indoor swimming pool.

Richard and Pat Taylor handed the school over to their son-in-law David Chaplin in 1977. He and their daughter Sally remained until 2002. In the recent past, the purpose-built pre-prep was added, as were a theatre, sports hall, and in 2000, the Millennium Library and classroom complex. In 2002, the Chaplins handed over the school to Julie Robinson, who was head until the summer of 2010. Richard Follett took over as headmaster, taking up the post in January 2011. He left in the Summer Term of 2017, with the current headmaster being Joff Powis.

In recent years the school theatre has been refurbished and re-opened as the Chaplin Theatre in honour of David Chaplin, who became headmaster on Richard Taylor's retirement.

Notable alumni
Tom Avery, polar explorer
Tom Chaplin, Tim Rice-Oxley, and Richard Hughes - members of Keane
Sir Andrew Gilbart, High Court Judge (q.v.)
Jules Knight, singer, and actor
Dan Poulter, Conservative Member of Parliament (MP) for Central Suffolk and North Ipswich 
Sir Tim Smit, founder of The Eden Project

References

External links
 Site of former school members

1938 establishments in England
Educational institutions established in 1938
Preparatory schools in East Sussex